The Wilderness Woman is a lost 1926 American silent romantic comedy film directed by Howard Higgin. It starred Aileen Pringle and Lowell Sherman. First National Pictures produced and distributed.

Cast
Aileen Pringle as Juneau MacLean
Lowell Sherman as Alan Burkett
Chester Conklin as 'Kodiak' MacLean
Henry Vibart as The Colonel
Robert Cainas as The Colonel's Henchman
Harriet Sterling as Squaw
Burr McIntosh as The Judge

References

External links
 The Wilderness Woman at IMDb.com 

 lobby cards(archived)

1926 films
Lost American films
American silent feature films
Films directed by Howard Higgin
First National Pictures films
American black-and-white films
American romantic comedy films
1926 romantic comedy films
1926 lost films
Lost romantic comedy films
1920s American films
Silent romantic comedy films
Silent American comedy films